This is a list of properties and districts in Franklin County, Georgia that are listed on the National Register of Historic Places (NRHP).

Current listings

|}

References

Franklin
Buildings and structures in Franklin County, Georgia